The Flyin' Cowboy is a lost 1928 American silent Western film directed by B. Reeves Eason and starring Hoot Gibson. It was produced and distributed by Universal Pictures.

Cast
 Hoot Gibson as Bill Hammond
 Olive Hasbrouck as Connie Lamont
 Harry Todd as Tom Gordon
 William Bailey as James Bell
 Buddy Phillips as Chuck Ward
 Ann Carter as Alice Gordon

References

External links

 
 

1928 films
Lost American films
Universal Pictures films
Films directed by B. Reeves Eason
American black-and-white films
Lost Western (genre) films
1928 Western (genre) films
1928 lost films
Silent American Western (genre) films
1920s American films
1920s English-language films